Gene Folk (September 7, 1924 - February 28, 2003) was an American ophthalmologist who specialized in the diagnosis and treatment of strabismus.  A charter member of the American Association for Pediatric Ophthalmology and Strabismus, he later served as President of this organization.  With Martin Urist, Folk helped found the "Chicago" school of strabismus, whose ideas competed with and stimulated those of Marshall M. Parks, Arthur Jampolsky, and other prominent strabismologists.  During the 1950s and 1960s, Urist and Knapp's contributions led to a much improved understanding of so-called A and V "pattern" strabismus, where the amplitude of deviation varies in up- and downgaze.

Early life
Eugene R. Folk was born on September 7, 1924 to Max Lyon and Martha Rubin Folk. Folk graduated from the University of Chicago Laboratory School in 1940, and subsequently served as second lieutenant during World War II

Marriage and children
Folk is survived by his wife, Meg Folk, three daughters, and two granddaughters.

Offices held and honors 
President Chicago Ophthalmologic Society, 1973
President American Association for Pediatric Ophthalmology and Strabismus, 1984-5
Frank D. Costenbader lecturer, AAPOS, 1995
Professor, University of Illinois College of Medicine, Illinois Eye and Ear Infirmary, Department of Ophthalmology
Faculty / staff member, Loyola Stritch School of Medicine Department of Ophthalmology, Weiss Memorial Hospital, Skokie Valley Hospital, and John H. Stroger, Jr. Hospital of Cook County

Posthumous honor 
The first Eugene R. Folk MD Endowed Lecture was presented by Burton J. Kushner, MD at the American Academy of Ophthalmology Annual Meeting on October 15, 2005.
Dr. Sherwin J. Isenberg gave the second Folk Lecture on September 26, 2006 at The University of Illinois Eye and Ear Infirmary. The third Folk lecturer was David Guyton, who spoke on strabismus on September 19, 2008.

Published works (partial list) 
 Folk, ER: Treatment of strabismus 1965—ISBN B0007ENHYU Publisher: C.C. Thomas

See also
Pediatric ophthalmology

References

2003 deaths
American ophthalmologists
Pediatric ophthalmologists
University of Illinois Chicago faculty
1924 births
University of Chicago Laboratory Schools alumni